Aristotelia parephoria is a moth of the family Gelechiidae. It was described by Clarke in 1951. It is found in Argentina.

References

Moths described in 1951
Aristotelia (moth)
Moths of South America